Living Faith Church Worldwide (also known as Winners' Chapel) is an Evangelical charismatic Christian denomination and a megachurch. The headquarters is located in Ota, Nigeria. The organization has since become a global network of churches with over 6 million members in 147 countries.

History 
The beginning of the church manifested on May 2, 1981, when David Oyedepo (aged 26) had a spiritual encounter while lodging in one of the rooms within the International Hotel located in the Omi-Asoro Quarters of Ilesa city, in the present day Osun State of Nigeria. He claimed to have an eighteen-hour supernatural encounter which was a vision from God. God spoke to him saying, "Now the hour has come to liberate the world from all oppressions of the devil, through the preaching of the Word of faith; and I am sending you to undertake this task". In 1983, the church began operating with four members on December 11.

Faith Tabernacle

Canaanland was procured in 1998 and was initially . It is in Ota, Ogun, Nigeria. The church's international headquarters, Faith Tabernacle, was built in Cannanland between 1998 and 1999, taking twelve months to complete. The foundation laying took place on August 29, 1998.

In 1999, the Faith Tabernacle was inaugurated with 50,400 seats.

On Dec 11 2013, Oyedepo's first son, David Oyedepo Jnr, ministered for the first time at the church's annual Shiloh gathering.

In December 2015, Oyedepo Jnr became the resident pastor of the Faith Tabernacle. Oyedepo announced the commencement of the construction of a 100,000 capacity sanctuary called "The Ark" (It was formerly called Faith Theatre). The Ark will specifically take 106,000 seats and will include a 20 Floor Mission Tower (International Headquarters Facility). It is to be built on the site of the old Faith Academy adjoining Faith Tabernacle which will now become its overflow facility. The groundbreaking of the project took place on Thursday 25 March 2021.

Organization 

As of 2014, the Church was in 65 countries.

Dominion Publishing House 
The publishing house that grew out of Winner's Chapel was founded on 5 December 1992. Dominion Publishing House has published over 120 books, most of which have been written by Oyedepo.

Beliefs 
The Church is founded upon twelve core emphases called the 12-Pillars. The theological position of the church is Pentecostal.

The denomination has a charismatic confession of faith.

Education 
Several educational institutions are linked to the chapel, including Covenant University, Landmark University, Faith Academy and over 150 Kingdom Heritage Model Schools. In addition, there is a ministry training college called The Word of Faith Bible Institute.

United Kingdom
In 2014, the church applied to open a Kingdom Heritage Model School in Kent. Concerns were raised by the National Secular Society about the church linking disobedience to witchcraft. The application was later withdrawn.

Shiloh 
Every year in December, the church hosts a global event called Shiloh. The church says the mandate for this event is drawn from the Bible books of Joshua 18:1 and 1Samuel 1:3. The event is held mostly in the first week of December.

The church sees the purpose of the event as being to usher the visitation of God to his people. It also marks the end of the Church's calendar year.

As of 2012, there were millions in attendance. The Presiding Bishop also said up to 160 nations hooked up to Shiloh 2015, with nationals from 55 nations present at the Canaanland, Ota, Ogun State.

See also 

 Bible
 Born again
 Worship service (evangelicalism)
 Jesus Christ
 Believers' Church

References

External links
 , official website of the Faith Tabernacle
 Winners Chapel London
 Winners Chapel New York
 Covenant University
 Dominion Publishing House
 Landmark University

1981 establishments in Nigeria
Charismatic denominations
Christian organizations based in Nigeria
Christianity in Lagos
Evangelical megachurches in Nigeria
Organizations based in Ogun State
Pentecostal denominations established in the 20th century
Religious organizations based in Lagos
Christian organizations established in 1981
Word of Faith churches